British-Irish girl group Girls Aloud have embarked on six concert tours of the United Kingdom and Ireland, five of which were in arena-sized venues.

The group initially planned to embark on a Popstars: The Rivals tour in March 2003, alongside their fellow winners One True Voice as well as other contestants. However, the tour was cancelled due to poor ticket sales. Girls Aloud's manager Louis Walsh said the group would tour by themselves later that year; however, these plans never came into fruition. In 2004, dates for Girls Aloud's first tour were announced. The What Will the Neighbours Say...? Tour reached twenty theatres over the course of twenty two shows. In 2006, Girls Aloud embarked on their second tour, performing in ten arenas across the United Kingdom.  The Chemistry Tour is the group's shortest tour and their only not to reach the island of Ireland. Kimberley Walsh described the show as "bigger and better." The introduction depicts Girls Aloud as five women created by a mad scientist, referencing their reality show beginnings. The stage included a catwalk which extended into the audience. The tour received widespread acclaim from contemporary music critics who complimented the show's relentless fun. In support of their first greatest hits, Girls Aloud embarked on The Greatest Hits Tour in 2007. The show, dubbed the group's "raunchiest tour ever", received favorable reviews but was chastised for the number of covers performed.

2008's Tangled Up Tour saw Girls Aloud embark on their longest tour yet. The show reportedly cost an estimated £3 million to stage, with £250,000 worth of pyrotechnics. The stage outfits were designed by Welsh designer Julien MacDonald. For the opening number, the girls were suspended from the ceiling wearing black cloaks. They also performed a stripped-down ballad section on a catwalk in the middle of the arena. Many reviews focused on Girls Aloud's provocative attire, comparing it to Madonna's Erotica era. The tour was mostly praised by critics, who noted that "Girls Aloud remain confidently the only pop show in town" and they "pulled out all the stops." Girls Aloud also performed a number of open-air concerts over the summer. The Out of Control Tour was announced for 2009. Initially, just ten tour dates in bigger arenas across the United Kingdom and Ireland were announced. Due to arenas selling out, Girls Aloud had to add a number of live shows to the tour. They also learned a pole-dancing routine. The sell-out tour earned millions in gross revenue.

Girls Aloud have performed at London gay nightclub G-A-Y multiple times to promote the singles "The Show", "Life Got Cold", "Wake Me Up", and "Long Hot Summer". They also performed at the venue to launch the release of their albums Sound of the Underground, What Will the Neighbours Say?, Chemistry, and Tangled Up. The group have also performed at a number of festivals, including Big Gay Out in 2005 and V Festival in 2006 and 2008. Girls Aloud also supported Coldplay alongside Jay-Z at Wembley Stadium for two consecutive nights in September 2009.

Concert tours

Notable concerts

See also
 Girls Aloud discography
 Girls Aloud videography
 List of awards and nominations received by Girls Aloud
 List of Girls Aloud songs

References

External links

 
 

Girls Aloud